Dimcha Peak is the rocky, partly ice-free peak rising to 948 m in southeastern Poibrene Heights on Blagoevgrad Peninsula, Oscar II Coast in Graham Land, Antarctica.

The feature is named after the settlement of Dimcha in northern Bulgaria.

Location

Maps
 Antarctic Digital Database (ADD). Scale 1:250000 topographic map of Antarctica. Scientific Committee on Antarctic Research (SCAR), 1993–2016.

Notes

References
 Dimcha Peak. SCAR Composite Antarctic Gazetteer.
 Bulgarian Antarctic Gazetteer. Antarctic Place-names Commission. (details in Bulgarian, basic data in English)

External links
 Dimcha Peak. Copernix satellite image

Mountains of Graham Land
Oscar II Coast
Bulgaria and the Antarctic